The Sunbeam may refer to:

The Sunbeam (1912), an American film directed by D.W. Griffith
The Sunbeam (1916), an American film directed by Edwin Carewe
The Sunbeam (1857), children's book